One Night with You is a 1948 British musical comedy film directed by Terence Young and starring Nino Martini, Patricia Roc and Bonar Colleano.

Plot
A famous opera singer engaged for the lead in an Italian movie loses his identity papers and is stranded at a railway station with a young British woman.

Cast
 Nino Martini as Giulio
 Patricia Roc as Mary Santell
 Bonar Colleano as Piero Santellini
 Hugh Wakefield as Santell
 Guy Middleton as Matty
 Charles Goldner as Fogliati
 Stanley Holloway as Tramp
 Willy Fueter as Pirelli
 Miles Malleson as Jailer
 Martin Miller as Police Inspector
 Richard Hearne as Station Master
 Irene Worth as Lina Linari
 Judith Furse as Second Writer
 Stuart Latham as First Writer
 Brian Worth as Third Writer
 Christopher Lee as Pirelli's Assistant
 Andreas Malandrinos as Waiter
 Percy Walsh as Hotel Proprietor
 John Warren as First Ticket Collector
 Cyril Smith as Second Ticket Collector
 Armand Guinle as Restaurant Manager
 Ferdy Mayne as First Detective
 Tristram Butt as Second Detective

Critical reception
The New York Times called it "a limp, tedious and transparent farce hardly worth all the strenuous histrionics and singing...One Night With You, in short, is a long, dull time"; whereas, more recently, the Radio Times called it "An occasionally diverting British-made comedy, enlivened by a supporting cast that includes Bonar Colleano, Stanley Holloway and the soon-to-be great stage actress Irene Worth."

References

External links

1948 films
British musical comedy films
1948 musical comedy films
1940s English-language films
Films directed by Terence Young
British black-and-white films
1940s British films